Chandra Tejas (born 7 November 1984) is an Indian cricketer. He is a right-handed batsman and right-arm off-break bowler who plays for Kerala. He was born in Kannur.

Between 1999 and 2007, Tejas played for Kerala's youth cricket teams from Under-14 level to Under-25 level.

Tejas made a single first-class appearance for the side, during the 2007-08 Ranji Trophy season, against Tripura. From the lower-middle order, he scored 19 runs in the first innings in which he batted, and 6 not out in the second.

Tejas played for Cordiant Sports Foundation in a Twenty20 tournament during the 2007-08 season, helping the team reach the final. He helped the same team win the final of a 45-over competition the following season, and played in a Cricket Association tournament with a Kerala-based team who reached the final before being comprehensively beaten by Uttar Pradesh.

External links
Chandra Tejas at Cricket Archive 

1984 births
Living people
Indian cricketers
Kerala cricketers
Sportspeople from Kannur
Cricketers from Kerala